"Automatic" is a song recorded by American vocal group the Pointer Sisters for their tenth studio album Break Out (1983). The song was released by the Planet label on January 13, 1984 as the second single from the album. It was written by Brock Walsh and Mark Goldenberg.

"Automatic" reached position number five on the US Billboard Hot 100 and became one of their signature songs. Eventually, three other singles from Break Out reached the top-ten on the Hot 100 consecutively. Billboard named the song number 94 on their list of "100 Greatest Girl Group Songs Of All Time".

"Automatic" was the group's first Top 40 hit to feature Ruth Pointer's distinctive contralto on lead.

Background 
According to Ruth Pointer, "Automatic" was the final song chosen for Breakout: "We were taking a break from recording in the office of Jim Tract, who was Richard Perry's right-hand man, and Jim mentioned that he had a stash of tapes we might want to listen to [while on] a breather...We all sat up straight when we first heard ['Automatic'] and told Richard we wanted to include it on the album. 'Okay,' he said 'But who would sing the low part?' 'Are you kidding me?' I said, I'll do the low part!'"

Although Break Out largely comprised dance tracks, its lead single was the ballad "I Need You", chosen by producer Richard Perry in hopes of reinforcing the Pointer Sisters presence at R&B radio: the dance track "Jump (for My Love)" was intended as the second single but the heavy airplay afforded "Automatic" as an album cut by both dance clubs and radio stations caused the substitution of "Automatic" for "Jump..." as the second single release from Break Out, although "Jump..." would become the most successful US single off Break Out when it became the album's third single. The first Top 40 hit to feature Ruth Pointer's distinctive contralto on lead, "Automatic" reached #5 on the Hot 100 in Billboard in April 1984, also charting on the magazine's Hot R&B/Hip-Hop Songs and Hot Dance Club Play rankings, its #2 R&B chart peak making "Automatic" the highest charting R&B hit by the Pointer Sisters as a trio (in their original four-woman format the Pointer Sisters did score an R&B #1 hit with "How Long (Betcha' Got a Chick on the Side)"). Holding "Automatic" out of the top position of the R&B chart (for three weeks) was "Somebody's Watching Me" by Rockwell.

In the United Kingdom, "Automatic" would afford the Pointer Sisters their all-time biggest hit, spending two weeks at #2 on the UK chart in May 1984 while stuck behind The Reflex by Duran Duran when it also reached #1 in Ireland. "Automatic" also afforded the Pointer Sisters Top-Ten success in Belgium (#5 on the Flemish chart), the Netherlands (#9), and New Zealand (#8). In Australia, "Automatic" reached a chart peak of #15. The B-side of "Automatic" was "Nightline" featuring June Pointer on lead. "Nightline" was also originally featured on Break Out but was dropped from later pressings of the album to allow for the inclusion of the remix of "I'm So Excited".

 Personnel 
The Pointer Sisters
 Ruth Pointer – lead vocals 
 Anita Pointer – backing vocals 
 June Pointer – backing vocals 

Musicians
 Stephen Mitchell – synthesizers 
 Howie Rice – synthesizers 
 John Van Tongeren – synthesizers, Minimoog
 Brock Walsh – synthesizers, drum machine programming 
 Paul Fox – E-mu Emulator
 Dennis Herring – guitar
 Mark Goldenberg – guitar (bridge)
 Eddie Watkins Jr. – bass

 Charts 

 Weekly charts 

 Year-end charts 

Ultra Naté cover

Ultra Naté covered "Automatic" and released it as the third single from her album Grime, Silk, & Thunder. Her version topped the US dance chart, hitting number one in the issue dated April 28, 2007. This version appeared briefly in a nightclub scene of Looking: The Movie'' in 2016.

Music video
The music video for "Automatic" was directed by Karl Giant. Eric Henderson from Slant Magazine commented of the music video's beginning: "For the first two or three minutes, it's nothing if not a stalwart representation of your standard gay-bar video-jukebox fixture." Ultra Naté is later shown wearing a rhinestone-studded liquid Lycra while two men, apparently nude, watch her on their computers. Then Naté appears in a blow-up doll costume, which Henderson believed "sends the entire video into legitimately weird territory, as though David Meyers were asked to direct a video for Nine Inch Nails."

Track listingBelgian CD maxi-single "Automatic" (Original Radio Mix) – 3:13
 "Automatic" (Morgan Page vs. Peace Bisquit Radio Mix) – 3:03
 "Automatic" (Original Extended) – 6:12
 "Automatic" (Daz & Diddy Mix) – 7:17US CD maxi-single'''
 "Automatic" (Original Extended) – 6:16
 "Automatic" (Digital Dog Mix) – 6:31
 "Automatic" (Paul Jackson Version Excursion Mix) – 6:19
 "Automatic" (Spen & Thommy Sugar Vocal Mix) – 8:42
 "Automatic" (Daz & Diddy Mix) – 7:18
 "Automatic" (Funky Junction & NK Club Mix) – 6:29
 "Automatic" (Funky Junction & Splashfunk Mix) – 6:53
 "Automatic" (Monkey Brothers Ultra Bad Remix) – 8:40
 "Automatic" (Dave Pezza Electro Dub Mix) – 9:30
 "Automatic" (Shawn Q's Soltribe Vocal Mix) – 8:47
 "Automatic" (Morgan Page vs. Peace Bisquit Radio Mix) – 3:04

Charts

Other version
In 2006, Belgian singer Afi covered "Automatic". Her version became a minor hit in Belgium, where it reached top twenty on the Flanders Ultratip chart.

References

1984 singles
2007 singles
The Pointer Sisters songs
Ultra Naté songs
Irish Singles Chart number-one singles
Song recordings produced by Richard Perry
Planet Records singles
Tommy Boy Records singles
Grammy Award for Best Vocal Arrangement for Two or More Voices
1984 songs
Songs written by Mark Goldenberg